Lújar is a village in southern Spain in the Sierra Nevada, a couple of kilometres inland from the coast and the city of Motril along a fairly precipitous road. Its coordinates are  (36.7877, -3.4016). Its population is approximately 1,200.

History
The village was one of the first to be taken during the Spanish Civil War.

Facilities
There is a municipal open air swimming pool at the western end of the village, and a couple of bars.

References

Populated places in the Province of Granada